Nomada festiva is a rare species of nomad bee in the family Apidae. It is found in North America.

References

External links
 Discover Life - Notes from original scientific description, subsequent specimen collection and identification key

Nomadinae
Insects described in 1863